Urge to Build is a 1981 American short documentary film directed by Roland Hallé about individuals building their own homes. It was nominated for an Academy Award for Best Documentary Short.

Reception
In Film & Video News, Louis Reile stated that "Hallé and Hoover have succeeded in building a good film out of the stuff of everyday life".

References

External links

1981 films
American short documentary films
1980s short documentary films
1980s English-language films
1980s American films